Rivas is a city and municipality in southwestern Nicaragua on the Isthmus of the same name. The city proper is the capital of the Department of Rivas and administrative centre for the surrounding municipality of the same name.

Climate
Rivas has a tropical savanna climate (Köppen climate classification Aw) with a short dry season from January to April and a lengthy wet season from May to October.

Notable people
 Erasmo Ramírez, Major League Baseball pitcher.
 Violeta Chamorro, first female president of Nicaragua, was born in Rivas.

References

See also

Nicaragua Canal

Municipalities of the Rivas Department
Portages